The Georgia Redcoat Marching Band, commonly referred to as "The Redcoats", is the official marching band of the University of Georgia.

History

Early years
Originally called The Dixie Redcoat Marching Band, the University of Georgia Marching Band was founded on October 31, 1905 as part of the UGA Military Department, with 20 military cadets. The band's first non-military performance was at the 1906 Georgia-Clemson baseball game. For the first 25 years of the band's existence, members split their time between their studies, their military drill, the band, and the athletic events they were required to attend. During this time the school song "Glory, Glory to Old Georgia", arranged by bandsman and future Director of the Music Department Hugh Hodgson, became associated with the university. At a game against Georgia Tech in the late 1900s, a reporter for the Atlanta Journal who was not aware of the song's adoption, complained about "the incessant playing of "John Brown's Body", one of many songs that share the melody of uncertain origin.

The band was also a common feature of the parades held in the city of Athens, such as the 1915 Woodmen of the World Convention parade, and a parade signaling America's entry into World War I. Throughout the 1920s and 30s, the band, still under the Military Department, expanded by allowing non-military musicians to join, encouraged by the introduction of band scholarships. The band began to make short trips with the football team, depending on funding. In preparing for a fixture with Auburn in Columbus, Georgia, the band raised $700 for the train journey by instituting a "tag sale" among students, after which they had money left over for necessary repairs.

During the 1935 Georgia Bulldog football season, Georgia was scheduled to play Louisiana State in November. The Governor of Louisiana arranged for Louisiana to be represented by the Golden Band From Tigerland, one of the largest marching bands in the country. After seeing the small Georgia band against the LSU band, the alumni and athletic associations began to fund the expansion of the band with more instruments and members. Although, like most college and university bands, the number dwindled during World War II, the band had expanded again by 1955.

Redcoat Marching Band
In 1955, Dr. Mitchell handpicked Roger Dancz as Director, and the Redcoat Band excelled under Roger’s leadership. Roger brought his wife to UGA with him, Phyllis Dancz, who became the Director of the Auxiliaries. Before their arrival, the band was known simply as the Georgia Marching Band. With the arrival of the Danczes, the band began to grow in size and perform more elaborate halftime shows. In 1959, Phyllis Dancz formed the "Georgettes", a dance line that performs alongside the band during the pre-game and halftime shows. Later on, the Bulldog Banners, later known as the Georgia Flag Line, was formed to add color and motion to the halftime show.

The 1970s was the most prolific era of the Redcoats in terms of halftime shows. Shows performed by the Redcoats during this time included the "Six Flags" show, which featured bicycles, clowns and balloons, and the "Halloween Show", in which band members dressed in Halloween costumes and performed music from horror films. One show that received particularly wide commentary was the "Wedding Show", held during the 1978 Georgia-Vanderbilt game, during which a couple got married in a three-minute ceremony during halftime. Every aspect of the wedding ceremony was donated by Athens-area businesses. The performance was originally intended as a publicity opportunity for a movie called The Wedding, starring Desi Arnaz Jr., but those plans fell through.

The Redcoats began the 1980s as the marching band of the national football champions. The Redcoats traveled to New Orleans for three consecutive years from 1980 to 1983 for the Sugar Bowl. During this time the band purchased several new "silver" Sousaphones, some of which are still in use today.

Recent decades
During the 1990s, the band began focusing more on "corps" style marching, a format influenced by the major drum and bugle corps of which many Redcoats are members. In 1995, the Redcoats were outfitted in the first new uniforms since 1982, with a new logo. In 2000, the Redcoats received the Sudler Trophy for the "close historical relationship and outstanding contribution of Intercollegiate Marching Bands to the American way of life", the first band in the Southeastern Conference band to do so.

During the 2011–2012 season, the band presented a restructured pregame show, including some familiar elements, such as forming the arch, and the traditional "Spell Georgia Cheer" that used to take place during halftime. During this season, the Redcoats also moved from their seating in the northeast corner of the stadium to the west endzone, in an attempt to make the Redcoats more audible to the entire stadium. However, they returned to their previous location for the 2012–2013 season.

Pregame Show

The Redcoat Band pregame show incorporates various aspects of Georgia's football history and culture. The Feature Twirlers and Hairy Dawg start in the middle of the field. Hairy Dawg then goes onto the sidelines to get the crowd hyped when the band runs on the field. The show then starts with the band saluting three sides of the stadium with "Go Dawgs", followed by a Georgia spellout. The band then approaches midfield as it plays "Let's Go Dawgs". As the band forms the Arch, a symbol of the university and of the state of Georgia, they play Georgia's rally song "Glory, Glory".

Remaining in the Arch formation, the Redcoats perform Georgia's Alma Mater and the national anthem, before leading the crowd into the "Spell Georgia Cheer". The crowd then participates in "Calling the Dawgs", beginning with the "Georgia Bulldogs Cheer" (the north stands yell "Georgia" and the south stands respond with "Bulldogs"), followed by a celebrity or a former Georgia player leading the crowd in the traditional "Gooooo Dawgs! Sic 'Em!" chant.

The Redcoat Band then forms the image of the state of Georgia, with the feature twirlers in the spot of Athens, as the crowd sings along to UGA's official fight song "Hail to Georgia". There follows a performance of "The Battle Hymn of the Bulldog Nation", initiated by a solo trumpet player in the southwest corner of the stadium, followed by the "It's Saturday In Athens" pregame video and the team entrance to "Glory, Glory".

Athletic Bands

Derbies Pep Band
The Derbies Pep Band is directed by one or more student directors, under the supervision of faculty and staff. Derbies perform in situations where attendance by the full band is not feasible. This includes the New Member mixer held at the beginning of band camp, the Jacksonville Bulldog Club Party at the annual Georgia Florida game, and away games not attended by the full band. Membership is chosen by the band captains and is determined by ability, leadership, and seniority.

Fall Sports Band
Formerly known as Volleyball Band, the Fall Sports Band supports volleyball, soccer (drumline only), and men's and women's basketball events that occur during fall semester and during the holiday break. This group is also under the direction of student directors, working closely with graduate assistants, faculty, and staff. Membership for this group is typically chosen from the Derbies Pep Band.

Spring Sports Band
The Basketball Pep Band is under the direction of the associate director of Athletic Bands and graduate assistants. Membership is selected from members of the Redcoat Band, with additional personnel included when space is available. It performs at all home gymnastics meets, all men's and women's home basketball games, most basketball postseason tournaments, and select events in other sports including tennis and softball.

Soccer Drumline
The Soccer Drumline is under the direction of the percussion staff. The Soccer Drumline performs at select UGA Soccer games and is a big reason as to why UGA Soccer home games are so difficult for opposing teams to play at. They have been credited for being a huge presence at the games, and they rattle opposing teams while making the UGA Soccer team reportedly play even harder.

Appearances

The Redcoat Band performs at all Georgia home games, and travels to the Georgia-Florida Game in Jacksonville each year. The full band also makes occasional road game appearances, typically at Auburn and Georgia Tech. In the past the full Redcoat Band has accompanied the team to road trips at Clemson, Tennessee, Alabama, and South Carolina and neutral site games held in Atlanta. The Redcoat Band also performs at all Georgia bowl game appearances.

References

 Richards, Robin J.  The University of Georgia Redcoat Band: 1905-2005.  Arcadia Publishing, 2004. .
http://bands.music.uga.edu/redcoats/

External links
 Band history

University of Georgia
Southeastern Conference marching bands
Musical groups from Georgia (U.S. state)
Musical groups established in 1905
1905 establishments in Georgia (U.S. state)